James Russell Webster House is a historic home located at Waterloo in Seneca County, New York.  It is a temple front Greek Revival style residence.  When built in 1850-1855 it featured a two-story, three bay, side hall main block flanked by two symmetrical one story, three bay center hall wings. In the 1870s, a veneer of Italianate details were added during and expansion and modernization.  The expansion included adding a second story to each side wing.  The front facade features a pedimented portico supported by four Doric order columns.

It was listed on the National Register of Historic Places in 2007.

Gallery

References

External links
House web site

Houses on the National Register of Historic Places in New York (state)
Greek Revival houses in New York (state)
Houses completed in 1855
Houses in Seneca County, New York
National Register of Historic Places in Seneca County, New York
Waterloo, New York